Rama Varma Kochaniyan Thampuran (2 June 1912 – 5 February 2014) was an Indian royal, who was the Valiya Thampuran or oldest male member of the Cochin Royal Family. He was also a cricketer and tennis player. His widow Sarada Mani is the granddaughter of Ravi Varma V. He was one of the longest-lived members of any royal family.

Biography 
He completed his intermediate from Maharaja’s College, Ernakulam and graduated in commerce from Calcutta University.

He took up a government job and served in various departments, including civil supplies and road transport corporation.

References

 
 
 

1912 births
2014 deaths
Indian centenarians
Men centenarians
Indian cricketers
Cricketers from Kochi
Rulers of Cochin